Franciszek Ksawery Kasparek (Sambor, 29 October 1844 – 4 August 1903, Kraków) was a Polish jurist, professor of law and rector of Kraków University, founder of the first chair in international law in Poland (at Kraków University), and member of the Polish Academy of Learning in Kraków.

He was the brother-in-law of biologist Professor Maksymilian Nowicki of Kraków University and uncle of poet Franciszek Nowicki.

See also
List of Poles

References
 Kazimierz Opałek, "Kasparek, Franciszek Ksawery," Polski słownik biograficzny (Polish Biographical Dictionary), vol. XII, Wrocław, Polska Akademia Nauk (Polish Academy of Sciences), 1966–67, pp. 176–78.
 Andrzej Śródka, "Kasparek, Franciszek Ksawery," Uczeni polscy XIX–XX stulecia (Polish Scholars of the 19th–20th Centuries), vol. II (H–Ł), Warsaw, Aries, 1995, pp. 170–71.
 Biogramy uczonych polskich (Biographies of Polish Scholars), Część I: Nauki społeczne (Part I: Social Sciences), zeszyt (fascicle) 2: K-O (pod redakcją Andrzeja Śródki i Pawła Szczawińskiego [edited by Andrzej Śródka and Paweł Szczawiński]), Wrocław, Ossolineum, 1984.

1844 births
1903 deaths
Lawyers from Kraków
International law scholars
Rectors of the Jagiellonian University